Martin Mogridge (December 2, 1940 – February 29, 2000)  was a British transport researcher based in London. He proposed the Lewis–Mogridge position that traffic varies in relation to the potential avenues of travel available, thus arguing that adding new roads to a transport network was potentially counter productive (see Braess's paradox) if a wider knowledge of local transport routes was not applied.

Works 
 Estimation of Regional and Sub-regional Household Income Distributions and Their Use in Demand Forecasting, 1972
 Travel in Towns: Jam Yesterday, Jam Today and Jam Tomorrow, 1990
 Metropolis Or Region, 1994
 The Rejuvenation of Inner London, 1996
 The self-defeating nature of urban road capacity policy, 1997

References

1940 births
2000 deaths
British urban planners
People from Welwyn Garden City